Galu or Galv in Iran may refer to:
Galu, East Azerbaijan
Galv, East Azerbaijan
Galu, Anbarabad, Kerman Province
Galu, Jiroft, Kerman Province
Galu, West Azerbaijan